KEDB (105.3 MHz) is a commercial radio station licensed to Chariton, Iowa.

KEDB is the Iowa affiliate for AccuWeather, FOX News Radio, FOX Business Network, and FOX Sports Radio.

KEDB Program Schedule

24/7 Format 
Scott Shannon's True Oldies Channel

Saturday 
7a-11a: Time Warp with Bill St. James

11a-3p: Casey Kasem's American Top 40 (The 80s)

3p-7p: America's Greatest Hits with Scott Shannon

7p-10p: Nina Blackwood's Absolutely 80s

Sunday 
7a-10a: Dick Bartley Presents Rock & Roll's Greatest Hits (The 60s)

10a-1p: Casey Kasem's American Top 40 (The 70s)

1p-4p: Dick Bartley's Classic Hits

External links
KEDB FCC Public File
KEDB Station Website

EDB